Michelle Jacqueline Krusiec (born Ya-Huei Yang; ; October 2, 1974) is an American actress, writer and producer.

Early life
Krusiec was born in 1974 in Taiwan. She was adopted at age five and raised in America by her father's elder sister, who had married a Polish American. Krusiec's adoptive father renamed her Michelle Jacqueline, because he wanted her to have a French name.

Krusiec studied English and theater at Virginia Polytechnic Institute and State University, graduating with a B.A. in 1996. She also studied Shakespeare and women's literature at the University of Oxford on a scholarship.

Career

Television and voicework
Krusiec was recruited to be one of six globe-trotting travel reporters for the Discovery Channel series Travelers in 1996. Along with Barbara Alvarez, Robin Kipp, Pearce Bunting, Patrick Michael, Foster Soloman, and later Lisa Clark, she traveled to over 50 different locations on the show. Krusiec played the 18-year-old Molly O'Brien in the Star Trek: Deep Space Nine episode "Time's Orphan". She co-starred in the NBC Saturday morning sitcom One World and played the role of Exquisite Woo on Popular. She played Mei-Ling Hwa Darling, one of the Darling family's daughters-in-law, in ABC's dramedy, Dirty Sexy Money. She appeared in The Mind of the Married Man as Sachiko, a massage parlor employee. She had a recurring role as "Nadine Park" on Season 4 of Fox's Fringe, and has also appeared on TV shows such as NBC's Community as "Wu Mei", a love interest of Chevy Chase's character, Pierce Hawthorne, General Hospital as Attorney Grace Yang, The Secret Life of the American Teenager as Emily, Touch as Lanny Cheong, Nip/Tuck as Mei, CSI: Miami as Susan Lee, CSI: NY as Lisa Kim, NCIS, Grey's Anatomy, Weeds, Without a Trace, Cold Case as Kara, Monk as Maria, ER as Tong-Ye, and Titus as recurring character Nancy.

In 2020, Krusiec played Anna May Wong in Ryan Murphy's Netflix series, Hollywood.

Krusiec provided various voices for multiple episodes of Seth MacFarlane's animated series American Dad!.

Film
Krusiec was a Best Actress nominee in the Golden Horse Film Festival for her performance in a U.S. independent film Saving Face (2005), written and directed by Alice Wu, in which she plays a Chinese American surgeon named Wilhelmina Pang ("Wil") juggling the demands of her girlfriend, Vivian Shing (played by Lynn Chen) and pregnant mother (played by Joan Chen). Krusiec appeared in a number of feature films including Knife Fight as Shannon, Sunset Stories as Nova, Relative Insanity as Marsha, Far North as Anja, the daughter of Michelle Yeoh's character, What Happens in Vegas as Chong, Cameron Diaz's character's competitive co-worker, Dumb and Dumberer as Cindy, The River Murders as Sung Li opposite Ray Liotta, Christian Slater, and Ving Rhames, Daddy Day Care as the English teacher, Take Me Home as Suzanne, Shuffle as Kevin's Mother, and independent film projects including Tanuj Chopra's Nice Girls Crew alongside Lynn Chen and Sheetal Sheth, Shawn Chou's Tomato and Eggs opposite Keiko Agena and Sab Shimono, and Erin Li's L.A. Coffin School opposite Elizabeth Sung and Megan Lee.

Theater
Krusiec wrote, directed, and performed a one-woman show entitled "Made in Taiwan" that premiered in Los Angeles and in New York at the New York International Fringe Festival of Theater, among other venues. She has received funding from Visual Communications to develop the play into a feature film.

Krusiec toured with the cast of David Henry Hwang's play, Chinglish, in the role of Xi Yian. The first stop of the play was at the Berkeley Repertory Theatre, and then the South Coast Repertory (as the play is a joint production between the two theaters), and then to the Hong Kong Arts Festival in Hong Kong. The production of the play is directed by two-time Obie winner Leigh Silverman.

In 2018, Krusiec starred in The Public Theatre's production of Hansol Jung's play Wild Goose Dreams, in the co-leading role of Yoo Nanhee.

Filmography

Film

Television

Video games

References

External links

Official website

1974 births
Actresses from Virginia
Alumni of the University of Oxford
American adoptees
American film actresses
American television actresses
Living people
People from Churchill County, Nevada
People from Virginia Beach, Virginia
Taiwanese emigrants to the United States
Virginia Tech alumni
20th-century American actresses
21st-century American actresses
American actresses of Taiwanese descent